Warren County is a U.S. county located in the Commonwealth of Virginia. The 2020 census places Warren County within the Washington-Arlington-Alexandria, DC-VA-MD-WV Metropolitan Statistical Area with a population of 40,727. The county was established in 1836. The county seat is Front Royal.

History 

By 1672 the entire Shenandoah Valley was claimed for hunting by the Iroquois Confederation following the Beaver Wars. Some bands of the Shawnee settled in the area as client groups to the Iroquois and alternately to the Cherokee after 1721. The Iroquois formally sold their entire claim east of the Alleghenies to the Virginia Colony at the Treaty of Lancaster in 1744. Warren County was established in 1836 from Frederick and Shenandoah counties. At that time the county had a population of 7,000 people, a quarter of which were enslaved. Wedding records show marriages of people born in the 1770s marrying in the 1800s who head households of four to eight "free colored" so the early demographics of the population are unclear. Joist Hite lead the Sixteen Families into the Lower Shenandoah Valley. Some consider that group the first European settlers of the area, others believe different claims. Either way, Presbyterians of Scotch-Irish lineage and Quakers followed.

Rail service was established in 1854 with the construction of the Alexandria, Orange and Manassas Gap Railroad between Manassas and Riverton. This line was soon extended to Strasburg in time to become a factor in the Battle of Front Royal on May 23, 1862, and throughout the Civil War. Lumber, agriculture, manufacturing and grain mills provided employment in the region for decades after the Civil War. The county is named for Joseph Warren. During the Civil War the Battle of Front Royal took place in the county on May 23, 1862. On September 23, 1864, William Thomas Overby and five others of then Lt. Col. John S. Mosby's 43rd Virginia Battalion of Partisan Rangers were captured by cavalry troops under the command of then Brig. Gen. George A. Custer in Front Royal out of uniform and were executed as spies.

2019 Warren County Economic Development Authority Executive Director Jennifer McDonald Scandal 

In 2017, questions were raised about the validity of an alleged $40 million economic development deal that had been brought to the community by Curt Tran, the owner of a company called IT Federal, over the redevelopment of the Avtex Superfund site.

In 2018, Warren County Economic Development Authority executive director Jennifer McDonald was charged with filing false police reports about an alleged rock-throwing incident that she claimed had occurred at her home.

In 2019, McDonald and other parties were embroiled in a massive financial scandal that some observers have characterized as the largest embezzlement scheme in the history of the state of Virginia. The fraud scheme, which involved the alleged embezzlement of $21 million in county funds through fictitious development schemes and insider deals, was uncovered by the Virginia State Police Bureau of Criminal Investigation's Culpeper field office.

The Virginia State Police launched a probe into the business practices of McDonald in conjunction with the Front Royal Police Department and the Federal Bureau of Investigation.

Sheriff McEathron, who had been indicted after it was revealed he was McDonald's business partner, committed suicide.

Jennifer McDonald was charged with 32 felony counts for her role in the scheme. 14 current and former municipal officials were indicted and faced criminal charges, including the entire Warren County board of supervisors as well as the former Warren County Attorney and the head of the Warren County schools division.
These charges were later dropped as the judge ruled there was no basis for the allegations.

Geography

The highest point is Hogback Mountain in Shenandoah National Park, along the border with Rappahannock County.

Adjacent counties
 Frederick County, Virginia – north
 Clarke County, Virginia – northeast
 Fauquier County, Virginia – east
 Rappahannock County, Virginia – southeast
 Page County, Virginia – southwest
 Shenandoah County, Virginia – west

National protected areas
 Cedar Creek and Belle Grove National Historical Park (part)
 George Washington National Forest (part)
 Shenandoah National Park (part)

Demographics

2020 census

Note: the US Census treats Hispanic/Latino as an ethnic category. This table excludes Latinos from the racial categories and assigns them to a separate category. Hispanics/Latinos can be of any race.

2000 Census
As of the census of 2000, there were 31,584 people, 12,087 households, and 8,521 families residing in the county. There were 13,299 housing units at an average density of 62 per square mile (24/km2). The demographics of the county is (2000) 92.71% White, 4.83% Black or African American, 0.27% Native American, 0.43% Asian, 0.02% Pacific Islander, 0.46% from other races, and 1.29% from two or more races.  1.56% of the population were Hispanic or Latino of any race.

There were 12,087 households, out of which 32.80% had children under the age of 18 living with them, 55.60% were married couples living together, 10.00% had a female householder with no husband present, and 29.50% were non-families. 24.00% of all households were made up of individuals, and 8.80% had someone living alone who was 65 years of age or older.  The average household size was 2.57 and the average family size was 3.04.

In the county, the population was spread out, with 25.60% under the age of 18, 7.60% from 18 to 24, 30.60% from 25 to 44, 23.90% from 45 to 64, and 12.30% who were 65 years of age or older.  The median age was 37 years. For every 100 females, there were 96.70 males.  For every 100 females age 18 and over, there were 94.90 males.

The median income for a household in the county was $42,422, and the median income for a family was $50,487. Males had a median income of $37,182 versus $25,506 for females. The per capita income for the county was $19,841.  About 6.00% of families and 8.50% of the population were below the poverty line, including 8.70% of those under age 18 and 10.40% of those age 65 or over.

Economy 

For many years, Avtex Fibers (formerly known as the American Viscose Corporation from 1910 to 1976), was the county's largest employer and taxpayer. At its height, it employed over 800 residents throughout Front Royal and Warren County.

Towards the late 1980s, however, the company's main plant in Front Royal was forced to close as a result of numerous environmental violations, which eventually resulted in the site being declared a Superfund site. The county, reeling from the sudden loss of jobs and tax revenue, established the Warren County Economic Development Authority (WCEDA) to stimulate and diversify its economy as well as the economy of Town of Front Royal, its county seat. The purpose of the WCEDA is to foster and stimulate industry and economic development within Warren County and the town of Front Royal.

Top employers
According to the county's comprehensive annual financial reports, the top employers by number of employees in the county are the following.

Transportation 

 Front Royal Area Transit (FRAT) provides weekday transit for the town of Front Royal.
 Page County Transit  - the People Movers provides weekday transit for the town of Luray and weekday service between Luray and Front Royal.

Major highways

Education

College 
 Christendom College

Public schools 

 Skyline High School (9–12)
 Warren County High School (9–12)
 Warren County Middle School (6–8)
 Skyline Middle School (6–8)
 A.S. Rhodes Elementary School (K–5)
 E. Wilson Morrison Elementary School (K–5)
 Hilda J. Barbour Elementary School (PreK–5)
 Leslie Fox Keyser Elementary School (K–5)
 Ressie Jefferies Elementary School (K–5)

Preparatory school 
 Randolph-Macon Academy (6–12)

Communities

Town
 Front Royal (county seat)

Census-designated places
 Apple Mountain Lake
 Chester Gap (mostly in Rappahannock County)
 Shenandoah Farms
 Shenandoah Shores
 Skyland Estates

Other unincorporated communities
 Ashby
 Bentonville
 Bethel
 Browntown
 Buckton
 Cedarville
 Happy Creek
 Howellsville
 Karo
 Limeton
 Linden
 Milldale
 Nineveh
 Overall
 Reliance
 Riverton
 Rockland
 Waterlick

Politics

Prior to 1952, the county was dominated by the Democratic Party like most counties in Virginia, but between then and 1976, it was a swing county. Since 1980, it has become consistently Republican.

Notable people
 Thomas Ashby, born in Warren County, physician and Maryland state legislator
 Thomas M. Allen, born in Warren County, clergyman and university official in Missouri
 Tareq Salahi, Real Housewives of DC star and infamous White House Gate Crasher

See also
 National Register of Historic Places listings in Warren County, Virginia

References

 
Virginia counties
Northern Virginia counties
Washington metropolitan area
1836 establishments in Virginia
Populated places established in 1836